Lewis Township is a township in Gove County, Kansas, USA.  As of the 2000 census, its population was 13.

Geography
According to the USGS, it contains two cemeteries: Pyramid View and Swedish Lutheran.

The stream of Hell Creek runs through this township.

References
 USGS Geographic Names Information System (GNIS)

External links
 US-Counties.com
 City-Data.com

Townships in Gove County, Kansas
Townships in Kansas